NCLR may refer to:
National Center for Lesbian Rights
National Council of La Raza
National Conference of Law Reviews
National Council for Learning Resources, the official representation of libraries and learning resources in the American Association of Community Colleges
North Carolina Law Review
North Carolina Literary Review